Neurophyseta laudamialis is a moth in the family Crambidae. It was described by Francis Walker in 1859. It is found in Venezuela.

The hindwings are pure white, with a mostly brown disk, including an elongated white lunule and a short straight exterior white line. The submarginal line is black and the costa is mostly luteous (yellowish), with a black dot near the base and another by the exterior line, as well as a brown oblique line near the base, interrupted by a black discal spot. There are two diffuse brown lines on the hindwings.

References

Moths described in 1859
Musotiminae